Rockit is the nineteenth studio album by Chuck Berry, released in 1979 by Atco Records. It was his only release for the label, following Berry's departure in 1975 from Chess Records and his last studio album for 38 years, until Chuck in 2017.

Title and packaging 
The album cover depicted Berry's guitar in the image of the Millennium Falcon starship, from the 1977 film Star Wars. According to Stephen Thomas Erlewine, the artwork bizarrely (and somewhat appealingly)" capitalized on "the post-Star Wars wave as it features Chuck's signature Gibson orbiting the Earth (which also nicely plays into the pun of the title, a pun so slight that it's possible to not realize it's a pun without the artwork)".

Critical reception 

Reviewing Rockit in 1979 for The Village Voice, Robert Christgau gave the album a B-plus grade and was surprised by its quality:

Along with 1964's St. Louis to Liverpool, Christgau considered Rockit one of two full-length albums recorded by Berry in his lifetime that were "worthy of the name", a "groove" record "sharpened by two back-end songs skewering the racist society he'd striven so audaciously to integrate and enlighten". Observer journalist Ron Hart named it among Berry's five best albums. In a retrospective review for AllMusic, Erlewine gave Rockit three-and-a-half out of five stars and said, despite conceding to contemporary music trends with a somewhat "bright and tight" production, Berry offered "three or four terrific songs and a bunch of enjoyable straight-ahead rockers that aren't quite as memorable but sure sound good as they play".

Track listing
All songs written by Chuck Berry
 "Move It" – 2:27
 "Oh What a Thrill" – 3:06
 "I Need You Baby" – 3:09
 "If I Were" – 3:02
 "House Lights" – 4:28
 "I Never Thought" – 3:50
 "Havana Moon" (re-recording) – 5:05
 "Wuden't Me" – 2:41
 "California" – 2:16
 "Pass Away" – 5:33

Personnel

Musicians
 Chuck Berry –  guitar, vocals
 Kenny Buttrey –  drums
 Johnnie Johnson –  piano
 Jim Marsala –  bass
 Bob Wray –  bass

Technical
 Tony Gottlieb – production assistance
 Doug Morris – executive producer
 Kyle Lehning –  engineer, mixing
 Bob Defrin – art direction
 Don Brautigam – cover illustration

References

External links

Chuck Berry albums
1979 albums
Albums produced by Chuck Berry
Atco Records albums